Trilobitella is a genus of flies belonging to the family Sphaeroceridae.

Species
T. taiwanica Papp, 2008

References

Sphaeroceridae
Diptera of Asia
Sphaeroceroidea genera